Namyang Bang clan is one of the Korean clans. Their Bon-gwan is in Hwaseong, Gyeonggi, Gyeonggi Province. According to the research held in 2000, the number of the Namyang Bang clan was 27454.

See also 
 Korean clan names of foreign origin

References

External links 
 

 
Korean clan names of Chinese origin
Bang clans